Halammohydridae is a family of cnidarians belonging to the order Actinulida.

Genera:
 Halammohydra Remane, 1927

References

Actinulida
Cnidarian families